Red Warszawa is a Heavy metal band from Copenhagen, Denmark formed in 1986.

Discography

Studio albums
 Hævi Mætal og Hass (1996)(Heavy Metal and Hash)
 Skal Vi Lege Doktor? (1998)(Wanna Play Doctor?)
 Tysk Hudindustri (2000)(German Skinindustry)
 Omvendt Blå Kors (2002)(Upside-down Blue Cross)
 Return of the Glidefedt (2004)(Return of the Slide Grease)
 De 4 Årstider I Nordvest (2010)(The 4 Seasons In Northwest)

Live albums
 Polsk punk på P-dagen (1991)
 Live Aus Kaiser Bierwurst Halle (2001)

Compilations
 My Poland Collection (2006)

Singles
 Julemandens Selvmordsbrev (1997)(Santa Claus' Suicide Letter)
 Jarmers Plads (2010) (Jarmer's Square)

Demos
 Skyd Sven (1987) (Shoot Sven)
 Helt op i Bageren (1991) (All the way up in the baker)
 Norsk Black Metal (1995) (Norwegian Black Metal)

Videography

Videos
 Polsk Punk På P-Dagen (1999) (Polish Punk on the P-day)
 Jeg Bor I Det Sølvgrå Kuppeltelt (2003) (I live in the silver-grey cupola tent) 
 Stive Gamle Mænd Som Stønner (2004) (Drunk old men that groan)

Music Videos
 Bøsse Dræbt Med Stegegaffel (Gay killed with carving fork)
 Tror Du Det Er For Sjov Jeg Drikker (Do you think I drink for fun)
 Skinboy
 Fjæsing (Weever)
 Norsk Black Metal (Norwegian black metal)

References

Discographies of Danish artists
Heavy metal group discographies